Scopula disclusaria is a moth of the family Geometridae. It was described by Hugo Theodor Christoph in 1881. It is endemic to Russia.

References

Moths described in 1881
disclusaria
Endemic fauna of Russia
Moths of Asia